Xavier University School of Medicine is a private for-profit offshore medical school located in Oranjestad, Aruba. It is not associated with Xavier University, a private not-for-profit Jesuit university located in Cincinnati, Ohio.

About
Xavier University School of Medicine (XUSOM) was founded in 2004 and is chartered by the government of Aruba with authorization by the Ministry of Education of Aruba to confer the Doctor of Medicine (M.D.) degree and other health professions. XUSOM receives an extension of ACCM accreditation, through 2028.

The old school building is located in Oranjestad, the capital and largest city in Aruba. The old campus houses classrooms with audiovisual aids, laboratories including an Anatomy dissection lab with plastinated cadavers and Anatomage table, skills and simulation labs, faculty offices, administrative and support staff, a library, and transportation facilities.

Academics
The medical training at Xavier University School of Medicine at Aruba is a four-year program of basic and clinical sciences. The student-to-teacher ratio is approximately 6:1.

Accreditation and recognition
 Xavier University School of Medicine is listed in the World Directory of Medical Schools (WDMS).
Xavier University School of Medicine is recognized by the New York State Education Department (NYSED) to allow students to complete more than 12 weeks of clinical clerkships in New York State. XUSOM is one of eight Caribbean medical schools so approved by NYSED.
Xavier University School of Medicine is accredited by the Accreditation Commission on Colleges of Medicine (ACCM) of Ireland. ACCM is the official accreditation body for the medical schools in Aruba.
In 2022, Xavier University announced it earned reaccreditation by the Accreditation Commission on Colleges of Medicine (ACCM) through December 31, 2028.

See also 
 International medical graduate
 List of medical schools in the Caribbean

References

External links
 

Educational institutions established in 2004
Universities in Aruba
Schools of medicine in Aruba
2004 establishments in Aruba
Oranjestad, Aruba